The  Bayernliga, the fifth tier of the German football league system and highest football league in the state of Bavaria, has had four teams annually promoted to the league, the champions of the three Landesligas, and a fourth club, determined by an annual promotion round. It involved the runners-up from the three Landesligas and the team in the Oberliga placed right above the relegation ranks.

The Bavarian football federation decided on drastic changes to the league system from 2012 onwards. With the introduction of the Regionalliga Bayern from 2012 to 2013, it placed two Bayernligas, north and south, below the new league as the new fifth tier of the German league system. Below those, five Landesligas instead of the existing three were set, which would be geographically divided to limit travel and increase the number of local derbies.

History and modus 
In 1963, alongside the establishment of the Bundesliga, a single-division, highest league for the state of Bavaria, the Amateurliga Bayern was established, too. Below this league, three regional Landesligas were formed to replace the previously existing 2. Amateurligas:
 Landesliga Bayern-Nord, covering the Regierungsbezirke of Upper Franconia and Lower Franconia
 Landesliga Bayern-Mitte, covering Middle Franconia, Upper Palatinate and Lower Bavaria
 Landesliga Bayern-Süd, covering Upper Bavaria and Swabia

From the 1963–64 season onwards, the champions of each of these three leagues were directly promoted to the Amateurliga Bayern, or, as it is commonly called, the Bayernliga. In turn, the bottom three teams in the Bayernliga were relegated to the Landesliga, according to their region of origin.

In 1978, the Amateurliga Bayern was renamed Amateur Oberliga Bayern.

In 1981, this modus changed as the Bavarian football association wanted each runners-up team in the Bavarian leagues to have a chance for promotion, too. Nowadays, the statutes of the BFV actually specify that every runners-up in Bavaria has the right to take part in promotion round, providing the league it can earn promotion to is part of the Bavarian football league system.

A system was established whereby the three Landesliga runners-up and the Bayernliga team placed right above the relegation ranks determined one more team to enter the league for the next season. A draw would establish which two teams met each other in the first round in an on-off game, with all games to be played on neutral grounds, preferably at a location half-way between the two clubs. The winners of those two games would then advance to a final to determine the team that would play in the Bayernliga next season.

Exceptions existed in regards to the number of teams promoted. If the Bayernliga champion managed to win promotion to the 2. Bundesliga and no team from that league was relegated to the Bayernliga, an extra team was promoted from the Landesliga. Also, in 1994, due to the formation of the Regionalligas, eight teams from the Landesligas earned promotion to the Bayernliga with the promotion round being played between the third placed teams. A similar situation existed in 2008, when the 3. Liga was established. Generally, after 1994 in a most seasons more than one club was promoted.

In 1994, the Amateur Oberliga Bayern was renamed Oberliga Bayern.

Because of the establishment of the Regionalliga Bayern in 2012 and the expansion of the Bayernliga from one to two regional divisions a large number of clubs earned promotion to the league in 2012. Additionally, the number of Landesligas was expanded from three to five.

As the 2019–20 season was interrupted by the coronavirus disease pandemic in Germany that broke out in March 2020, it was later suspended until 31 August, forcing a cancellation of the 2020–21 season as the Bavarian Football Association approved a resumption of the preceding one, which concludes in mid-2021, thus postponing the play-offs.

 Clubs directly promoted 
The champions of the three Landesligas who earned direct promotion to the Bayernliga where:

Three divisions: from 1963 to 2012

Five divisions: since 2012

Source:

 Clubs taking part in the promotion round 
The clubs having taken part in the promotion round were:

Three divisions: from 1963 to 2012

Five divisions: since 2012

 Die Deutsche Liga Chronik 1945 – 2006  DSFS, pp. I 72 – I 144.
 Bold denotes promoted team, or, in case of the participant from the Bayernliga, the club maintained its league status.

References

Sources
 Die Bayernliga 1945 - 1997,  DSFS. 1998.
 Deutschlands Fußball in Zahlen,  An annual publication with tables and results from the Bundesliga to Verbandsliga/Landesliga. DSFS.
 kicker Almanach,  The yearbook on German football from Bundesliga to Oberliga, since 1937. Kicker Sports Magazine.
 Süddeutschlands Fußballgeschichte in Tabellenform 1897-1988  History of Southern German football in tables, by Ludolf Hyll.
 50 Jahre Bayrischer Fussball-Verband  50-year-anniversary book of the Bavarian FA. Vindelica Verlag. 1996.
 Die Deutsche Liga-Chronik 1945-2005''  History of German football from 1945 to 2005 in tables. DSFS. 2006.

External links 
 Bayrischer Fussball Verband (Bavarian FA) 
 Das deutsche Fussball Archiv Historic German league tables 
 Bavarian League tables and results 
 Website with tables and results from the Bavarian Oberliga to Bezirksliga 

German football promotion rounds
Bayernliga
1981 establishments in West Germany